Edward Raczyński was the name of three members of a Polish aristocratic family: 

 Edward Raczyński (1786–1845) Polish conservative politician, protector of arts, founder of the Raczynski Library in Poznań
 Edward Aleksander Raczyński (1847–1926) grandson of E. Raczyński, founder of the famous Raczyński Art Gallery in Rogalin
 Edward Bernard Raczyński (1891–1993), son of E. A. Raczyński, Polish aristocrat, diplomat, politician and the President of Poland in exile between 1979 and 1986